Liu Min (born February 1958), is a Chinese military dancer and professor. She is a member of the People's Liberation Army.

Biography
In February 1958, Liu was born in Hefei, Anhui. After graduating from primary school, she entered Anhui Art School and she joined the Chinese People's Liberation Army Naval Song and Dance Troupe. In 1994, Liu went to the United States to study with her husband. In September 1999, Liu was transferred to People's Liberation Army Academy of Art to teach dance.

Liu was a member of the 8th, 9th, 10th National Committees of the Chinese People's Political Consultative Conference.

References

1958 births
Living people
People from Hefei
Actresses from Anhui
Chinese female dancers